Winnebago Township is located in Winnebago County, Illinois, United States. As of the 2010 census, its population was 5,291, and it contained 1,976 housing units.

Geography

Demographics

References

External links
City-data.com

1849 establishments in Illinois
Populated places established in 1849
Townships in Winnebago County, Illinois
Townships in Illinois